Istvan Agh (born June 25, 1970, in Debrecen) is a Hungarian sport shooter. He competed at the 1992 Summer Olympics in the men's 50 metre pistol event, in which he placed sixth, and the men's 10 metre air pistol event, in which he tied for 14th place.

References

1970 births
Living people
ISSF pistol shooters
Hungarian male sport shooters
Shooters at the 1992 Summer Olympics
Olympic shooters of Hungary
Sportspeople from Debrecen